Thirumalai Nayak Palace is a 17th-century palace erected in 1636 CE by King Tirumala Nayaka, a king of Madurai's Nayaka dynasty who ruled Madurai from 1623 to 1659, in the city of Madurai, India.The building, which can be seen today, was the main palace, in which the king lived. The original palace complex was four times bigger than the present structure. In its heyday, the palace was considered to be one of the wonders of the South.

History

The Nayaks of Madurai ruled this Kingdom from 1545 until the 1740s and Thirumalai Nayak (1623-1659) was one of their greatest kings notable for various buildings in and around Madurai. During the 17th centuries the Madurai Kingdom had Portuguese, Dutch and other Europeans as traders, missionaries and visiting travellers. Over a span of 400 years many parts of the buildings suffered the destructive effects of war; a few, however, are sufficiently in repair to be converted into use by the garrison, as granaries, store-houses, powder magazines during time of East India Company.  King Thirumalai Nayak's grandson had demolished much of the fine structure and removed most of the jewels and woodcarvings in order to build his own palace in Tiruchirapalli. However Lord Napier, the Governor of Madras, had partially restored the palace from 1866 to 1872, and the subsequent restoration works carried out several years ago, today, we get to see the Entrance Gate, The Main Hall and the Dance Hall.

Design and construction
Built in 1636, as a focal point of his capital at Madurai, Thirumalai Nayak intended the palace to be one of the grandest in South India. The Interior of the palace surpasses many of its Indian contemporaries in scale. The interior is richly decorated whilst the exterior is treated in a more austere style.

The king hired an Italian architect to design the complex, and hence the Dravidian – Italian architecture. During this period Madurai was a thriving kingdom with Portuguese, Dutch and other Europeans as traders, missionaries and visiting travelers. This might have influenced the design inspirations of the palace.

During the 18th century many structures that were part of this palace were pulled down or incorporated into buildings in the adjacent streets. What remains is the enclosed court known as the Svarga Vilasam and a few adjoining buildings. The audience chamber of the Svarga Vilasam is a vast hall with arcades about 12 m high. The architecture is a blend of indigenous and Islamic forms. Thirumalai nayakar mahal is famous for its giant pillars.

Courtyard

The courtyard is surrounded by massive circular pillars. Now it has a circular garden.

Interior

The palace was divided into two major parts, namely Swarga Vilasam (Celestial Pavilion) and Ranga Vilasam. The royal residence, theatre, shrine, apartments armory, palanquin place, royal bandstand, quarters, pond and garden were situated in these two portions. The courtyard and the dancing hall are the major center of attractions of the palace. The domed structure in the centre is supported by stone ribs and is held up by massive circular columns topped and linked by pointed scalloped arches with an arcaded gallery opening into the nave above the side aisles.

Materials used
The structure was constructed using foliated brickwork and the surface details and finish in exquisite stucco called chunnam using chunnam (shell lime) and mixed with egg white to obtain a smooth and glossy texture.  The steps leading up to the hall were formerly flanked by two equestrian statues of excellent workmanship.

The decoration is done, (shell lime). The pavilions topped with finials that were covered with gold are on either side of the courtyard.

Popular culture

After independence, the Thirumalai Palace was declared as a national monument and is now under the protection of the Tamil Nadu Archaeological Department. This palace is open for the visitors daily. Many films are shot in the Palace, primarily due to the large pillars present. Notable films are Maniratnam's "Bombay" ("Kannalane" song), "Guru" ("Tera Bina" Song) etc. Vikram starrer "Bheemaa" ("Ragasiya Kanavugal" song). The palace is well equipped to perform light and sound shows depicting the story of Silappathikaram both in Tamil and English languages. The palace is a ticketed monument open from 10 am to 1 pm and 2pm to 5:30 pm.

References

External links

Madurai Nayak dynasty
Palaces in Tamil Nadu
Tourist attractions in Madurai
Buildings and structures in Madurai
Buildings and structures completed in 1636